Orleanesia is a genus of flowering plants from the orchid family, Orchidaceae. It contains 9 known species, all native to South America.

 Orleanesia amazonica  Barb.Rodr. - Brazil, Colombia, Venezuela, Bolivia, the Guianas 
 Orleanesia cuneipetala Pabst  - Brazil
 Orleanesia ecuadorana Dodson - Ecuador
 Orleanesia maculata Garay - Venezuela
 Orleanesia mineirosensis Garay - Brazil
 Orleanesia peruviana C.Schweinf. - Peru
 Orleanesia pleurostachys (Linden & Rchb.f.) Garay & Dunst. -  Colombia, Venezuela, Peru, Ecuador
 Orleanesia richteri Pabst  - Brazil
 Orleanesia yauaperyensis Barb.Rodr. -  Brazil, Venezuela

See also 
 List of Orchidaceae genera

References 

Berg Pana, H. 2005. Handbuch der Orchideen-Namen. Dictionary of Orchid Names. Dizionario dei nomi delle orchidee. Ulmer, Stuttgart

External links 

Laeliinae genera
Orchids of South America
Laeliinae